Events from the year 1997 in France.

Incumbents
 President: Jacques Chirac
 Prime Minister: Alain Juppé (until 3 June), Lionel Jospin (starting 3 June)

Events
27 January – It is revealed that French museums had nearly 2,000 pieces of art that had been stolen by Nazis.
25 May – Legislative Election held.
1 June – Legislative Election held.
31 August – Diana, Princess of Wales is killed in a car crash in Paris.
3 November – In France, striking truck drivers blockade ports during a pay dispute.

Arts and literature
6 September – A Jean Michel Jarre Oxygene in Moscow concert, celebrating the city's 850th anniversary, draws 3.5 million people.

Sport
17 April – Paris–Roubaix cycling race won by Frédéric Guesdon.
29 June – French Grand Prix is won by Michael Schumacher of Germany.
5 July – Tour de France begins.
27 July – Tour de France ends, won by Jan Ullrich of Germany.

Births
 3 January – Jérémie Boga, footballer
 9 January – Issa Diop, footballer
 12 March – Marie Hoyau, ski jumper
 26 August – Lisa Gautier, actress, dancer and singer
 11 September – Garance Le Guillermic actress
 December – Michelito Lagravere, Mexican-born bullfighter

Full date unknown
 Carla Ferrari, chef and TV presenter

Deaths

January to June
12 January – Jean-Edern Hallier, author (b. 1936).
8 March – Gershon Liebman, French rabbi (b. 1905)
16 March – Jean-Dominique Bauby, journalist, author and editor (b. 1952).
19 March – Jacques Foccart, politician (b. 1913).
19 March – Eugène Guillevic, poet (b. 1907).
6 April – Pierre-Henri Teitgen, lawyer, professor and politician (b. 1908).
16 April – Roland Topor, illustrator, painter, writer and filmmaker (b. 1938).
20 April – Jean Louis, costume designer (b. 1907).
3 May – Sébastien Enjolras, motor racing driver (b. 1976).
25 June – Jacques-Yves Cousteau, naval officer, explorer, ecologist, filmmaker, scientist, photographer and researcher (b. 1910).

July to September
12 July – François Furet, historian (b. 1927).
4 August – Jeanne Calment, supercentenarian and the oldest living person ever documented in history (b. 1875).
16 August – Jacques Pollet, motor racing driver (b. 1922).
25 September – Jean Françaix, composer, pianist, and orchestrator (b. 1912).

October to December
1 November – Roger Marche, international soccer player (b. 1924).
13 November – James Couttet, alpine skier (b. 1921).
16 November – Georges Marchais, head of the French Communist Party (b. 1920).
25 November – Monique Serf, singer (b. 1930).
28 November – Georges Marchal, actor (b. 1920).
30 November – Françoise Prévost, actress (b. 1930).
1 December – Stéphane Grappelli, jazz violinist (b. 1908).
7 December – Fernand Cornez, cyclist (b. 1907).
13 December – David Rousset, writer and political activist (b. 1912).
18 December – Michel Quoist, priest and writer (b. 1921).
25 December – Anita Conti, explorer, photographer and first French female oceanographer (b. 1899).

Full date unknown
Jean Pierre Capron, painter (b. 1921).
Jean-Marie Domenach, writer and intellectual (b. 1922).
Jacques Leguerney, composer (b. 1906).
Fernand Oury, teacher and creator of modern French schooling (b. 1920).
Jean-Pierre Sudre, photographer (b. 1921).
Claude Tresmontant, philosopher, hellenist and theologian (b. 1925).

See also
 List of French films of 1997

References

1990s in France